Full moon is a lunar phase.

Full Moon may also refer to:

Literature 
Full Moon (novel), by P. G. Wodehouse
Full Moon o Sagashite or Full Moon, a manga
Full Moon, play by Emlyn Williams
Full Moon (play), by Reynolds Price 1994
Full Moon, short story by Jia Pingwa, 1977, inaugural national prize for short stories, established in 1978 by the Chinese Writers Association
"Full Moon" (short story), by Georgette Heyer
Full Moon, the second book in the Dark Guardian series
Full Moon, a biography of Keith Moon written by Dougal Butler

Film and TV
 Full Moon (1937 film), Terang Boelan, a 1937 film from the Dutch East Indies
 Full Moon (1960 film) Chaudhvin Ka Chand, 1960 Urdu-language Indian film
 Full Moon (1988 film) (German: Vollmond), Swiss art film 
 Full Moon (2017 film), (German: Vollmond), German film with Oliver Stokowski 
 Dolunay, Turkish TV series with Özge Gürel and Can Yaman
 Full Moon Features, an American film company

Music 
Full Moon Productions, an American record label (1991–2012)
Full Moon Records, an American record label (1974–1992)

Albums 
Full Moon (Brandy album), or the title song (see below), 2002
Full Moon (Charlie Daniels album), 1980
Full Moon (Kris Kristofferson and Rita Coolidge album), 1973
Full Moon (Paul Brady album), 1986
Full Moon (Sunmi EP), 2014
Full Moon (EXID EP), 2017

Songs 
"Full Moon", a song by the Kinks from Sleepwalker 1977
"Full Moon" (Armand Van Helden song), 2000
"Full Moon" (Brandy song), 2002
"Full Moon" (Sunmi song), 2014
"Full Moon", a song by Rage from Speak of the Dead, 2006
"Full Moon", a song by Heavenly from Carpe Diem, 2009
"Full Moon", a song by Santana from Spirits Dancing in the Flesh, 1990
"FullMoon", a song by Sonata Arctica from Ecliptica, 1999
"Full Moon", a song by Stratovarius from Dreamspace (bonus track), 1994
"Fill Moon on the Highway", a song by Can from Landed, 1975

Other uses 

 Full Moon Hotel in Azerbaijan
 Full Moon Party in Thailand

See also 
 Full Moon Fever (disambiguation)
 
 Fool Moon (disambiguation)